Jenkin Lloyd Jones Sr. (1911/1912 – February 24, 2004) was the longtime owner and editor of the Tulsa Tribune.

In 1933, Jones. earned a degree in philosophy from the University of Wisconsin.

Jones  was the editor of the Tulsa Tribune from 1941 to 1988 and its publisher until 1991. Lloyd Jones' father Richard Lloyd Jones had bought the newspaper in 1919 from businessman-philanthropist Charles Page, and had also served as its editor. His brother Richard Lloyd Jones Jr served as president. His son Jenkin “Jenk” Lloyd Jones Jr. took over as editor and then publisher when Jones Sr. retired.

Jones Sr. was also the president of the American Society of Newspaper Editors in 1956, and was inducted into the Oklahoma Journalism Hall of Fame in 1972.

He died on February 24, 2004, at age 92.

Family
Jones' father, Richard Lloyd Jones, was a cousin of noted architect Frank Lloyd Wright, who designed his home in Tulsa in 1929. The house, officially known as Westhope, was added to the National Register of Historic Places (NRHP) on April 10, 1975. Its NRIS number is 75001575.

Notes

References

2004 deaths
American newspaper editors
 University of Wisconsin–Madison College of Letters and Science alumni
Writers from Tulsa, Oklahoma
American male journalists